Jean Ann Corston, Baroness Corston, PC (born 5 May 1942) is a British politician and life peer who served as Member of Parliament (MP) for Bristol East from 1992 to 2015, during which time she served as Chair of the Parliamentary Labour Party from 2001 to 2005.

Early life
Jean Ann Parkin went to Yeovil Girls' High School (now the Westfield Community School) on Stiby Road in Yeovil and the Somerset College of Arts and Technology. She worked at the Inland Revenue. At the London School of Economics, she gained a Bachelor of Laws in 1989. From 1989–90, she studied at the Inns of Court School of Law. She also studied with the Open University. She became a barrister.

Parliamentary career
Corston was Member of Parliament (MP) for Bristol East from April 1992 to 2005. Until stepping down at the 2005 general election, she was chair of the Parliamentary Labour Party, the first woman ever to hold that position.

On 13 May 2005 it was announced that she would be created a life peer, and on 29 June 2005 she was created Baroness Corston, of St George, in the County and City of Bristol.

She was commissioned by the Home Office, to conduct a report into vulnerable women in the criminal justice system of the United Kingdom, published in March 2007. It explores the idea that if a lot of women who are in prison are mentally ill, whether they should be there at all. The report outlines "the need for a distinct radically different, visibly-led, strategic, proportionate, holistic, woman-centred, integrated approach". The report is known as the Corston Report and has largely informed government policy on the matter. Progress and improvements by local probation services, the National Probation Service, Her Majesty's Prison service and the National Offender Management Service (NOMS) are regularly compared to the recommendations in this report.

Personal life
She married first Christopher Corston in 1961 with whom she had a son and daughter. Her partner from 1980 until he died in 2009 was Peter Townsend, the sociologist. The couple married in Bristol in 1985.

References

External links 
 
 BBC:  City MP to stand down at election
  see link from peers' section to biography
 The Corston Report: a review of women with particular vulnerabilities in the criminal justice system
 Guardian interview by Alison Benjamin, 3 May 2006: "Reasonable redress: Nine out of 10 women prisoners have been convicted of non-violent offences. Most are mothers and many are vulnerable. Will a government review urge alternatives to incarceration?" (with Curriculum Vitae).
 Guardian article on alternatives to prison for women offenders.
BBC News article on community sentencing for women instead of prison sentences.

1942 births
Living people
Alumni of the London School of Economics
Alumni of the Open University
Female members of the Parliament of the United Kingdom for English constituencies
Life peeresses created by Elizabeth II
Labour Party (UK) life peers
Labour Party (UK) MPs for English constituencies
Members of Parliament for Bristol
Members of the Privy Council of the United Kingdom
People from Yeovil
Politics of Bristol
Transport and General Workers' Union-sponsored MPs
UK MPs 1992–1997
UK MPs 1997–2001
UK MPs 2001–2005
20th-century British women politicians
21st-century British women politicians
20th-century English women
21st-century English women